Otto Gebühr (29 May 1877 – 13 March 1954) was a German theatre and film actor, who appeared in 102 films released between 1917 and 1954. He is noted for his performance as the Prussian king Frederick the Great in numerous films.

Early life
Born in Kettwig (today part of Essen) in the Rhine Province, the son of a merchant, Gebühr attended the gymnasium secondary school in Cologne and completed a commercial training. Alongside he took drama lessons and began his acting career at the Görlitz city theatre. In 1898 he joined the ensemble of the Königliches Hoftheater Dresden and from 1908 performed at the Lessing Theater in Berlin. As a World War I volunteer he achieved the rank of a Lieutenant in the German Army.

Film career
After the war he worked with director Max Reinhardt at the Deutsches Theater in Berlin. At the same time he obtained his first film performances with the help of his colleague Paul Wegener. He found the role of his lifetime in 1919, acting as King Frederick II in the historical drama The Dancer Barberina directed by Carl Boese, modeled on the life of ballerina Barbara Campanini (1721–1799). The first part of the UFA Fridericus Rex tetralogy starring Otto Gebühr playing the title role was released in 1922, followed by several further so-called "Fridericus-Rex-movies". The series was heavily criticized by contemporaries for supporting a widespread negative stance towards the Weimar Republic democracy and the yearning for a leader in waiting. Gebühr continued his performances in the Nazi period from 1933 onwards, last performing in The Great King, a 1942 German wartime propaganda film directed by Veit Harlan referring to the historic Miracle of the House of Brandenburg, which received the rare "Film of the Nation" distinction.

Gebühr died at Wiesbaden in 1954. His final film, Die Blonde Frau des Maharadscha, was released eight years after his death.

Filmography

 Die Vase der Semirames (1918)
 Sündiges Blut (1919)
 Verrat und Sühne (1919)
 The Girl from Acker Street (1920)
 Der Menschheit Anwalt (1920)
 Three Nights (1920)
 Whitechapel (1920)
 The Dancer Barberina (1920)
 Evening – Night – Morning (1920)
 The Golem: How He Came into the World (1920)
 Ships and People (1920)
 The Fear of Women (1921)
 The Raft of the Dead (1921)
 The Terror of the Red Mill (1921)
 Der Gang durch die Hölle (1921)
 Treasure of the Aztecs (1921)
 The Shadow of Gaby Leed (1921)
 A Dying Nation (1922, two parts)
 Fridericus Rex (1922-23, four parts)
 William Tell (1923)
 The Money Devil (1923)
 The Burning Secret (1923)
 Gobseck (1924)
 The New Land (1924)
 ...und es lockt ein Ruf aus sündiger Welt (1925)
 Passion (1925)
 The Wig (1925)
 The Iron Bride (1925)
 The Fallen (1926)
 Eternal Allegiance (1926)
 The Mill at Sanssouci (1926)
 The Sporck Battalion (1927)
 The Holy Lie (1927)
 The Old Fritz (1928)
  The Chaste Coquette (1929)
 Waterloo (1929)
 Scapa Flow (1930)
 Der Detektiv des Kaisers (1930)
 The Flute Concert of Sanssouci (1930)
 Der Erlkönig (1931)
 The Dancer of Sanssouci (1932)
 The Hymn of Leuthen (1933)
 Fridericus (1937)
 Das schöne Fräulein Schragg (1937)
 Women for Golden Hill (1938)
 Nanon (1938)
 The Merciful Lie (1939)
 Casanova heiratet (1940)
 Passion (1940)
 Bismarck (1940)
 Kopf hoch, Johannes! (1941)
 Much Ado About Nixi (1942)
 The Great King (1942)
 The Golden Spider (1943)
 Nacht ohne Abschied (1943)
 Immensee (1943)
 Fritze Bollmann wollte angeln (1943)
 When the Young Wine Blossoms (1943)
 Der Erbförster (1945)
 And the Heavens Above Us (1947)
  The Prisoner (1949)
 Anonymous Letters (1949)
  (1950, voice)
 Melody of Fate (1950)
 Three Girls Spinning (1950)
  The Lie (1950)
 Dr. Holl (1951)
 Immortal Beloved (1951)
 When the Evening Bells Ring (1951)
  Stips (1951)
 Sensation in San Remo (1951)
 Torreani (1951)
 Das ewige Spiel (1951)
 The Heath Is Green (1951)
 Oh, You Dear Fridolin (1952)
 A Thousand Red Roses Bloom (1952)
 Fritz and Friederike (1952)
 The Devil Makes Three (1952)
 Don't Ask My Heart (1952)
 When the Heath Dreams at Night (1952)
 Stars Over Colombo (1953)
 Street Serenade (1953)
 Red Roses, Red Lips, Red Wine (1953)
 Father Is Being Stupid (1953)
 The Blue Hour (1953)
 Have Sunshine in Your Heart (1953)
 Meines Vaters Pferde (1954, two parts)
 The Prisoner of the Maharaja (1954)
 The Man of My Life (1954)
 Sauerbruch – Das war mein Leben (1954)
 Rose-Girl Resli (1954)

Films with Otto Gebühr as Frederick the Great

 1920: The Dancer Barberina - director: Carl Boese
 1921–23: Fridericus Rex – director: Arzén von Cserépy
Teil 1 - Sturm und Drang
Teil 2 - Vater und Sohn
Teil 3 - Sanssouci
Teil 4 - Schicksalswende
 The Mill at Sanssouci (1926) – director: Siegfried Philippi
 1928: The Old Fritz – director: Gerhard Lamprecht
Teil 1 - Friede
Teil 2 - Ausklang
 1930: The Flute Concert of Sanssouci – director: Gustav Ucicky
 1932: The Dancer of Sanssouci – director: Friedrich Zelnik
 1933: The Hymn of Leuthen – director: Carl Froelich
 1936. Heiteres und Ernstes um den großen König - director: Phil Jutzi
 1936: Fridericus – director: Johannes Meyer
 1937: Das schöne Fräulein Schragg – director: Hans Deppe
 1942: The Great King – director: Veit Harlan

References

External links

Photographs and literature

1877 births
1954 deaths
Actors from Essen
People from the Rhine Province
German male film actors
German male silent film actors
19th-century German male actors
German male stage actors
20th-century German male actors
German Army personnel of World War I